Anthony DiCosmo (born August 8, 1977) is a former American football wide receiver who played two seasons in the Arena Football League with the New England Sea Wolves and Los Angeles Avengers. He played college football at Boston College and attended Paramus Catholic High School in Paramus, New Jersey. He was also a member of the Tampa Bay Buccaneers and New York/New Jersey Hitmen.

References

External links
Just Sports Stats
College stats

Living people
1977 births
Players of American football from New Jersey
American football wide receivers
African-American players of American football
Boston College Eagles football players
New England Sea Wolves players
New York/New Jersey Hitmen players
Los Angeles Avengers players
Sportspeople from Hackensack, New Jersey
Paramus Catholic High School alumni
21st-century African-American sportspeople
20th-century African-American sportspeople